Brian Jones (born April 22, 1971) is an American college basketball coach.  He is currently an assistant coach at Bradley University. Jones is a graduate of University of Northern Iowa.  Prior to North Dakota Jones was a longtime assistant on the coaching staffs of Steve Alford.  While working with Alford, he participated in the four NCAA Division I men's basketball tournaments, once with Southwest Missouri St. and three times with Iowa.  Jones was named the 18th head coach of the University of North Dakota Fighting Sioux basketball program on May 25, 2006.  Under Jones' tenure at North Dakota, the University won back-to-back Great West tournament championships in 2011 and 2012, and he led North Dakota to four consecutive appearances in the CollegeInsider.com Postseason Tournament. In 2017, he led North Dakota to the NCAA Division I Tournament for the first time.

Jones was the interim head coach at Illinois State from February 14, 2022, through the end of the season following Dan Muller's resignation.

Head coaching record

References

External links
 North Dakota profile

1971 births
Living people
American men's basketball coaches
American men's basketball players
Basketball coaches from Illinois
Basketball players from Illinois
College men's basketball head coaches in the United States
Illinois State Redbirds men's basketball coaches
Iowa Hawkeyes men's basketball coaches
Missouri State Bears basketball coaches
North Dakota Fighting Hawks men's basketball coaches
Northern Iowa Panthers men's basketball players